The Theban Tomb TT35 is located in  Dra Abu el-Naga, part of the Theban Necropolis, on the west bank of the Nile, opposite to Luxor. It is the burial place of the ancient Egyptian noble named Bakenkhons I, who lived during the 19th Dynasty, during the reign of Ramesses II. Bakenkhons was a High Priest of Amun.

Bakenkhonsu was the son of Roma, the High Priest of Amun and his wife who was also called Roma.
Bakenkhons' wife was named Meretseger. She held the titles of Chief of the Harem of Amun.

See also
 List of Theban tombs

References

Buildings and structures completed in the 13th century BC
Theban tombs